Ericomyrtus tenuior is a shrub endemic to Western Australia.

References

Eudicots of Western Australia
tenuior
Endemic flora of Western Australia
Plants described in 2015
Taxa named by Barbara Lynette Rye